The 2020–21 season was PAS Giannina F.C.'s 25th competitive season in the top flight of Greek football, 10th season in the Super League Greece, and 55th year in existence as a football club. They also competed in the Greek Cup, where they were knocked out in the semi-finals by Olympiacos.

Players 
updated 14 February 2021

International players

Foreign players

Personnel

Management

Coaching staff

medical staff

Academy

Transfers

Summer

In

Out 

For recent transfers, see

Winter

In

Out

Alternative

Pre-season and friendlies

Competitions

Super League 1

League table

Results summary

Fixtures

Play out round

Results summary

Fixtures

Greek Cup

Sixth round

Quarter-finals

Semi-finals

Statistics

Appearances 

Super League Greece

Goalscorers

Clean sheets

Disciplinary record

References

External links 
 official website

PAS Giannina F.C. seasons
Greek football clubs 2020–21 season